Melanostomias nigroaxialis is a species of barbeled dragonfish native to the Western Central Pacific. The species is bathypelagic and inhabits deep water.

References 

Fish described in 1978